Reinhold Maier (16 October 1889 – 19 August 1971) was a German politician and the leader of the FDP from 1957–1960. From 1946 to 1952 he was Minister President of Württemberg-Baden and then the 1st Minister President of the new state of Baden-Württemberg until 1953.

He served as the 4th President of the Bundesrat in 1952/53, the only FDP politician in German history to do so to date.

Maier was born in Schorndorf.

Early life 

Maier, a Protestant, was born the son of a municipal architect, Gottlieb Maier, in Schorndorf.

After attending grammar school in Schorndorf, Reinhold Maier attended the Dillmann-Gymnasium in Stuttgart and, in 1907, received his Abitur. He then studied law at the University of Grenoble and at the University of Tübingen. There he was a member of the South German (and liberally inclined) Tübingen fraternity "Academic Society Stuttgardia Tübingen". Here he met fellow aspiring politicians such as Eberhard Wildermuth, Karl Georg Pfleiderer, Konrad Wittwer and Wolfgang Haussmann. He received his doctorate in law in Heidelberg. During the First World War he took part as a soldier at the foot artillery regiment 13.  In 1920 he settled in Stuttgart and practiced as a lawyer. In 1924 he was inducted into the Masonic Lodge "Zu den 3 cedars" in Stuttgart. During the Nazi era he worked as a lawyer; his wife Gerta Goldschmidt flew to the United Kingdom with their two children. Reinhold Maier was forced to divorce her under Nazi pressure but remarried her after the war in 1946.

Career
Already a member of the Progressive People's Party (Germany) (FVP) since 1912, Maier joined the newly formed left-wing liberal German Democratic Party (DDP) in 1918. In 1924 he became chairman of the Stuttgart District Association of DDP.

In 1945 Maier participated in the founding of the Democratic People's Party (Germany)(DVP), not to be confused with the  German People's Party of the Weimar Republic. The DVP was absorbed by the FDP in 1948.

Maier became Minister President of “Württemberg-Baden”, a constituent state of the subsequent ‘’Land’’ of Baden-Württemberg in 1945, following the collapse of the Nazi regime, which in its twilight had claimed the life of his former boss, the last elected Minister President Eugen Bolz, one of the 20 July Plot conspirators. As such, he preceded the West German state by setting up a constitutional democratic system in competition with the burgeoning SPD and communist parties, and the French and American occupation authorities. Despite his DVP party consistently polling less votes than Christian Democratic and socialist opponents, Maier steadfastly maintained coalitions with the liberals as the leading party.

After the formation of the coalition of FDP / DVP, SPD and All-German Bloc/League of Expellees and Deprived of Rights (BHE) under his leadership, simultaneous to the creation of the new state of Baden-Württemberg in 1952, the Hesse FDP Association requested the expulsion of Maier and the state chairman Wolfgang Haussmann (1903-1989) from the party along with the separation of the DVP from the FDP, but the coup was not successful. 
 From 1957 to 1960 he was Chairman of the FDP, and then until his death honorary chairman.

Deputy

Maier was 1932–1933 a member of parliament for the German State Party. On 23 March 1933, he voted for the Enabling Act together with the other four liberal Reichstag deputies Hermann Dietrich, Theodor Heuss, and Ernst Lemmer. The final sentence of his speech was: For the sake of people and country and in anticipation of a legitimate development, we will rescind our serious concerns and approve the Enabling Act.
According to the informations of Theodor Heuss in his memoirs, the five liberal Reichstag deputies have initially been divided with respect to the Enabling Act. Heuss had formulated two explanations, one for rejection, one for abstention. At his side, however, was only Hermann Dietrich. Heinrich Landahl, Ernst Lemmer and Reinhold Maier voted in the Reichstag group for approval.
Heuss and Dietrich were overruled, so then all Liberal MPs voted for the Enabling Act.
In the Weimar Republic Maier was a member of the German Democratic Party (DDP). In 1945 he was a founder of the Democratic People's Party (DVP), which is now the Baden-Württemberg-Organisation of the FDP.

He died in Stuttgart.

References

External links
 

1889 births
1971 deaths
People from Schorndorf
German Protestants
Presidents of the German Bundesrat
German Democratic Party politicians
Free Democratic Party (Germany) politicians
Members of the Landtag of Baden-Württemberg
People from the Kingdom of Württemberg
Grand Crosses 1st class of the Order of Merit of the Federal Republic of Germany
Members of the Reichstag of the Weimar Republic
Ministers-President of Baden-Württemberg